WWF LiveWire was an American professional wrestling television program that was produced by the World Wrestling Federation (WWF). It aired from 1996 to 2001 on the USA Network and later TNN.

History
Premiering on Saturday September 21, 1996, in its initial format, LiveWire was broadcast live and allowed viewers to phone-in and participate in the show. This was the first WWF program to feature such an "interactive" element. The show was used to summarize the weekly events in WWF programming and featured interviews with WWF personalities and allowed the fans to phone-in and ask questions to in-studio guests.

One of the more notable calls occurred during a brief cross-promotional angle involving Extreme Championship Wrestling and the World Wrestling Federation. On the October 5, 1996 episode of LiveWire, Paul Heyman, using the alias "Bruce from Connecticut," called in to LiveWire to express his discontent with boring WWF programming and the state of the promotion. Faarooq also debuted the concept of the Nation of Domination on LiveWire.

In February 1997, LiveWire later became exclusively a weekly summary show in similar style to that of WWF Mania. The show was hosted by Todd Pettengill and Sunny. Michael Cole later took over as host until July 2000 when he was succeeded by Jonathan Coachman. Both commentators would occasionally host the show together until the discontinuation of WWF LiveWire on August 18, 2001.  A former co-host of this show was Marissa Mazzola, who is the wife of Shane McMahon.

References

External links
 

Livewire
WWE Raw
Spike (TV network) original programming
USA Network original programming
1996 American television series debuts
2001 American television series endings